Federal Highway 19 (Fed. 19) is a free part of the federal highways corridors and runs along the Pacific coast of Baja California Peninsula from Cabo San Lucas up to Todos Santos where it turns inland and eventually joins Fed. 1 a few miles south of San Pedro, Baja California Sur. The route runs entirely within the state of Baja California Sur, with both its North and South termini meeting at Mexican Federal Highway 1.

Road distance-markers (indicating the distance in kilometers from north to south) are generally placed at the roadside each 5 km, and occasionally at more frequent intervals.

Towns and landmarks
 San Pedro
 Todos Santos
 El Pescadero
 Playa Migriño
 Cabo San Lucas

References

019